The Eastern Indo-Aryan languages, also known as Māgadhan languages, are spoken throughout the eastern Indian subcontinent (East India and Assam, Bangladesh), including Bihar, Uttar Pradesh, Jharkhand, Bengal, Tripura, Assam,  and Odisha; alongside other regions surrounding the northeastern Himalayan corridor. Bengali is official language of Bangladesh and the state of West Bengal, Tripura and the Barak valley of Assam while Assamese and Odia are the official languages of Assam and Odisha, respectively. The Eastern Indo-Aryan languages descend from Magadhan Apabhraṃśa and ultimately from Magadhi Prakrit.

Classification

The exact scope of the Eastern branch of the Indo-Aryan languages is controversial. All scholars agree about a kernel that includes the Odia cluster and the Bengali–Assamese languages, while many also include the Bihari languages. The widest scope was proposed by Suniti Kumar Chatterji who included the Eastern Hindi varieties, but this has not been widely accepted.

When the Bihari languages are included, the Eastern Indo-Aryan languages fall into four language groups in two broader categories:

Western Magadhan

Bihari
Bhojpuri
Caribbean Hindustani
 Magahi
Khortha  
 Maithili 
Bajjika (Western Maithili)
Angika(Southern Maithili)
Central Maithili 
Eastern Maithili
Thēthi
Jolaha
Kisan
Sadanic
Sadri (Nagpuri)
Kurmali (Panchpargania)
Tharuic
Chitwania Tharu
Dangaura Tharu
Sonha
Kathoriya Tharu
Kochila Tharu
Rana Tharu
Buksa
Majhi
Musasa
Unclassified Bihari
 Kumhali
 Kuswaric
Danwar
Bote-Darai

Eastern Magadhan

 Bengali–Assamese:
 Gaudic
 Bangali  (Eastern Bengali)
 Bishnupriya Manipuri
 Chakma
 Chittagonian
 Hajong
 Manbhumi (Western Bengali)
 Noakhailla (Southeastern Bengali)
 Rarhi (South-Central Bengali)
 Rohingya
  Sundarbani (Southern Bengali)
 Sylheti
 Tanchangya
 Varendri  (North-Central Bengali)
 Kamarupic:
 Assamese (Kamrupi, Goalpariya)
 Rangpuri, Surjapuri, Rajbanshi
 Odia languages
 Odia Family 
Baleswari (Northern Odia)
 Kataki (Central Odia)
Sambalpuri 
Sundargadi (Northwestern Odia)
Kalahandia
Desia
Ganjami (Southern Odia)
 Bodo Parja
 Bhatri
 Reli
 Kupia
 Halbic:
 Halbi, Kamar, Bhunjia, Nahari

Features
Grammatical features of the Eastern Indo-Aryan languages:

References

External links
 A Comparative dictionary of the Bihārī language, Volume 1 By August Friedrich Rudolf Hoernle, Sir George Abraham Grierson (1885)
 

Languages of India
Languages of Bangladesh
Languages of Nepal